is the art of using the Japanese weapon kusarigama. 

Kusarigamajutsu is featured in several separate martial arts such as Tendō-ryū, Suiō-ryū and Shintō Musō-ryū. The kusarigama is made up of three parts: the kama (a wooden handle with a curved blade (traditionally straight) protruding at a right-angle on one end, and a small loop at the other), and the kusari (a chain attached to the kama) and a weight at the end of the chain. In a confrontation the kusari is swung in wide sweeping arcs to distract and entangle the opponent and the kama is used to deliver a fatal strike.

Popular culture
 Teenage Mutant Ninja Turtles features kusarigamajutsu being used by Michaelangelo and Shini in the 2012 version. It was also used by Karai, the boar assassin Kojima, one of the Triceraton All-Stars, and some of the Foot Ninjas as well as some Karai Bots in the 2003 version.

See also
 Araki-ryū – Koryū that includes the use of the kusarigama
 Suiō-ryū – Koryū that includes the use of the kusarigama via the attached school of Masaki-ryū Fukuhara-ha kusarigamajutsu
 Toda-ha Bukō-ryū – Koryū that includes the use of the kusarigama
 Isshin-ryū kusarigamajutsu – School of kusarigamajutsu found in Shintō Musō-ryū
 Tendō-ryū kusarigamajutsu- School of kusarigamajutsu found in Tendō-ryū bujutsu

Sources

 Pascal Krieger: Jodô – la voie du bâton / The way of the stick (bilingual French/English), Geneva (CH) 1989, 

Japanese martial arts
Ninjutsu
Ninjutsu skills